Antony Rayns (born 1948) is a British writer, commentator, film festival programmer and screenwriter. He wrote for the underground publication Cinema Rising (its name inspired by Kenneth Anger's Scorpio Rising) before contributing to the Monthly Film Bulletin from the December 1970 issue until its demise in 1991. He has written for the British Film Institute's magazine Sight & Sound since the 1970s, and also contributed extensively to Time Out and to Melody Maker in the late 1970s.

He provides commentary tracks for DVD releases of Asian films. He coordinated the Dragons and Tigers competition for Asian films at the Vancouver International Film Festival from 1988 to 2006. In the 1980s, he presented a series called New Chinese Cinema on British television, showing (sometimes rare) films and biographies of eminent Chinese directors. He has also worked as a translator for English subtitles on films from Hong Kong, Japan, Korea, Taiwan and Thailand. For example, he wrote the English subtitles for the films of Huang Ming-chuan in the 1990s in Taiwan. He has also been given two awards for services to Japanese cinema: the Kawakita Prize in 2004 and the Foreign Ministry of Japan’s Commendation in 2008.

He wrote the screenplay for Away with Words, a feature film directed by cinematographer Christopher Doyle, starring Asano Tadanobu. He has written books about Seijun Suzuki, Wong Kar-wai and Rainer Werner Fassbinder.  In the 1970s, he began a book on Kenji Mizoguchi, which he had not completed at the time he recorded audio commentary for the Criterion Collection DVD release of Ugetsu in 2005.

Works

DVD commentary tracks
Accattone - Masters of Cinema
Akasen Chitai - Masters of Cinema.
A Brighter Summer Day - Criterion Collection.
An Actor's Revenge - BFI
Chungking Express - Criterion Collection.
Daughter of the Nile - Cohen Film Collection.
The Face of Another - Masters of Cinema.
The Host - Magnolia Home Entertainment, with director Bong Joon-ho.
In the Realm of the Senses - Criterion Collection.
Manila in the Claws of Light - Criterion Collection.
Mouchette - Criterion Collection.
Parasite - Criterion Collection, with director Bong Joon-ho.
Pitfall - Masters of Cinema.
Seven Samurai - Criterion Collection, with film scholars David Desser, Joan Mellen, Stephen Prince and Donald Richie.
Still Life - BFI.
Ugetsu - Criterion Collection.
Vampyr - Masters of Cinema 2008 release, which was subsequently licensed to the Criterion Collection for their edition.
Vengeance Is Mine - Masters of Cinema.
Veronika Voss - Criterion Collection.
Yi Yi - Criterion Collection, with director Edward Yang.
Sansho Dayu - Masters of Cinema.
Zu: Warriors from the Magic Mountain - Masters of Cinema

References

External links
 
 Tony Rayns at Rotten Tomatoes

1948 births
Living people
British film critics
British male journalists
Melody Maker writers
Place of birth missing (living people)
British subtitlers